Luxembourg made its penultimate Eurovision entry at the Eurovision Song Contest 1992 in Malmö, Sweden with the song "Sou fräi", sung by Marion Welter and Kontinent.

Before Eurovision

National final 
Contrary to the way that the Luxembourgish broadcaster, RTL Hei Elei, selected their entry in the past, a national final took place to select the song that would represent Luxembourg at the Eurovision Song Contest 1992 in Malmö, Sweden. Marion Welter was internally selected by RTL to sing two songs in a national final.
The final was held on 15 March at the RTL TV studios in Luxembourg as part of the tv show RTL Hei Elei, with the winner selected by postcard voting from two songs performed by Welter. The results were announced in the following episode of RTL Hei Elei on 22 March.

At Eurovision 
"Sou fräi" was performed 14th on the night of the contest, following Switzerland and preceding Austria. Welter, along with backing by the band Kontinent, placed 21st in a field of 23, receiving 10 points.

Voting

References

External links
Luxembourg National Final 1992

1992
Countries in the Eurovision Song Contest 1992
Eurovision